Louisa Douglas McCune (born 1970) is a philanthropy executive and magazine editor, working in the contemporary arts and animal well-being. She is the executive director of the Kirkpatrick Foundation in Oklahoma City, Oklahoma, where she is engaged with arts and culture, education, animal well-being, environmental conservation, and historic preservation. Under McCune's direction, the foundation has established two major animal well-being initiatives for the state of Oklahoma, to make the state “the safest and most humane place to be an animal by 2032” (launched in 2012), and to increase Oklahoma's cat and dog "live release" rate to 90 percent by 2025 (launched in 2018). Both of these efforts are a part of the foundation's Safe & Humane initiative.

McCune is also the editor in chief and co-founder of ArtDesk, a contemporary arts magazine published quarterly by the Kirkpatrick Foundation. Her background in publishing and editing includes a thirteen-year term as editor in chief of Oklahoma Today (1997-2011), preceded by an internship at Harper’s Magazine and freelance work for The American Benefactor, Worth, George, Mirabella, New York, Green, and Harper’s Magazine’s Franklin Square Press Fools for Scandal: How the Media Invented Whitewater. Her first job in journalism was at the Enid News & Eagle (1994-1995), as a general assignment reporter. McCune's most recent publishing project is Love Can Be: A Literary Collection About Our Animals (Kirkpatrick Foundation, 2018), which she co-edited with Teresa Miller. The book was distributed by the University of Oklahoma Press.

McCune has often credited a number of influencers in her work, including Christian Keesee (chairman, Kirkpatrick Foundation), Steven Walker (principal, Walker Creative), Joan Henderson (former publisher, Oklahoma Today), and Lewis Lapham (editor, Lapham's Quarterly).

Education 
McCune graduated from Enid High School in 1988 from her hometown of Enid, Oklahoma. She studied at Colorado Mountain College from 1988–89, and then the University of Colorado, Boulder, from 1989-90. In 1992 she graduated with a bachelor's degree from San Francisco State University.

Kirkpatrick Foundation 
McCune joined the Kirkpatrick Foundation in April 2011 as executive director. She is also secretary of the Board (ex officio) for the foundation.

In 2016 the foundation published The Oklahoma Animal Study (for which McCune served as editor). It is the first comprehensive study of a geographic region and its animal population. In 2018, McCune oversaw the production of Reporting Animal Cruelty, a manual created for veterinarians to use when dealing with cases of animal cruelty. The original version of the manual was created by Animal Folks Minneapolis.

As part of the Kirkpatrick Foundation's Safe & Humane initiative, the ANIMAL Conference of Ideas, Impact, and Inspiration was established in 2015 as a triennial event, hosted and directed by McCune. Other conferences organized under McCune's direction include the Save Lives. Unite Oklahoma event in April 2018 and the Intersection conference for Oklahoma Link Coalition, where the “Animal Friendly” Oklahoma Specialty updated license plate was unveiled.

Oklahoma Today
From 1997 to 2011, McCune served as editor in chief of Oklahoma Today magazine, a bimonthly print publication focused on the culture, food, places, people, and history of Oklahoma. Under her direction the magazine was awarded three Society of Professional Journalists (SPJ) Best Magazine awards, two Magazine of the Year awards from the International Regional Magazine Association, and other national and state-level recognition.

Publications 

Love Can Be: A Literary Collection About Our Animals, Co-Editor
ArtDesk, Editor in Chief
The Oklahoma Animal Study, Editor
Oklahoma Today, Editor in Chief
National Geographic Traveler, Contributor
Arthur Frommer’s Budget Travel, Contributor
Reader’s Digest, Reprint
Worth, Factchecker
The Oklahoman, Opinion Contributor
OKC Business, Opinion Contributor
Journal Record, Columnist
OKC Pets Magazine, Contributor
World Literature Today, Contributor
ZooSounds, Contributor
Voices from the Heartland, Contributor

In addition to contributions to these literary publications, McCune has judged the National Magazine Awards, Oklahoma Book Awards, and the Thatcher Hoffman Smith Prize,an award honoring college-level creativity.

Boards 

Kirkpatrick Foundation, secretary of the board, ex officio
Philanthropy Southwest, board member
Animal Grantmakers, board member
Kirkpatrick Family Fund, advisory trustee
Oklahoma Contemporary Arts Center, advisory trustee
Green Box Arts Festival, advisor
Wilson Arts (past)
Oklahoma Center for Poets and Writers (past)
Oklahoma Music Hall of Fame (past)
City Arts Center (past)
Oklahoma Center for Community and Justice (OKC Committee) (past)

Professional awards 
 Community Service Award (Dialogue Institute of the Southwest, May 2014)
 Pride of the Plainsmen Award (Enid High School, 2013)
 Achiever Under 40 (The Journal Record, 2007)
 Bill Thurman Memorial Media in the Arts Award at the Oklahoma Governor's Arts Awards (2003)
 Forty Under 40 Oklahoma City Leaders (OKC Business, 2002)
 Thirty Under 30 (Magazine Publishers of America,1999)

Interests and Advocacy 
McCune is an advocate for animal well-being, including farm animal welfare, particularly for pigs and chickens, rural communities, and fair markets for farmers and ranchers. She has also expressed opinions regarding private prisons and the over-incarceration of Oklahoma citizens. In 2016, McCune led a non-partisan public education initiative for Kirkpatrick Foundation related to State Question 777, also known as Right to Farm.

McCune has been a painter since her teenage years, crediting Alex Georges of Houston, Texas, with introducing her to the hobby. Over the years, she has exhibited paintings in Oklahoma City, once at a small salon showing in 2000 and again in 2018 at JRB Art at the Elms.

Personal Life and Accomplishments 
McCune is the daughter of Edward Allison McCune (1930-2005), a surgeon, and Margaret Douglas Rucks McCune (b. 1935), a homemaker. Her great-grandfather, W.W. Rucks, was the co-founder of Oklahoma City's Wesley Hospital (1910), which went on to become Presbyterian Hospital (1964) and later OU Medical Center. Her grandmother, Louise Earthman Rucks (1904-1989), wrote a column for thirty-six years about animals for The Daily Oklahoman called “Hound Hill," which is now the namesake for McCune's residence. McCune's paternal great-grandfather, John Starr Allison, was known as the pioneer town physician in Tahlequah, Oklahoma, for many decades until his death in 1955. Her paternal grandfather, Edward H. McCune, was an educator, recognized for his published works of poetry. He also coached Pretty Boy Floyd in basketball during his time in Sallisaw, Oklahoma. McCune is of Scottish descent. McCune has three older siblings: Joe McCune, a lawyer; Allison Davis, an entrepreneur; and Evelyn Stival, a homemaker.

McCune is the mother of three sons, with whom she resides: McCune (Mac); Rucks; and Edward. Her eldest son appeared in a Flaming Lips film, Christmas on Mars, as “the baby,” in a dream sequence with a Martian marching band. She was married to Chad Elmore from 2004 to 2015.

From September 1992 to May 1993, McCune lived in West Africa, where she had temporary employment with Evergreen Helicopters on a World Health Organization project to eradicate onchocerciasis. McCune received her FAA Pilot's License in 1993. In 2002, she founded the Sallie McFarland Rucks Memorial Reader Series at Wilson Arts Elementary School in Oklahoma City. She is a member of St. Paul's Episcopal Cathedral in Oklahoma City. In 2006, McCune successfully nominated editor Lewis Lapham to the American Society of Magazine Editors Hall of Fame. In his letter of support, Kurt Vonnegut described Lapham's absence from the hall of fame as being akin to Babe Ruth not being in Cooperstown. He was inducted in February 2007.

References 

1970 births
American editors
American women editors
Living people
21st-century American women
Writers from Enid, Oklahoma
Enid High School alumni